Syncron is an after-sales service software company with a global presence. Syncron's global headquarters are located in Stockholm, Sweden, with major subsidiary offices around the world located in the United States, United Kingdom, Japan, France, Germany, Italy, India, and Poland. Syncron was ranked as the fastest growing supply chain management software supplier for 2007 and 2008, in the annual Deloitte Fast 500 Technology Awards, EMEA region.

History
In September 2006, Syncron announced the acquisition of its UK-based partner.

In 2007, Syncron announced its entrance to the North America market by establishing an office in Atlanta, Georgia. This allowed the company to support the United States operations of global customers such as JCB and Volvo Construction Equipment, and also establish a local presence from which it could begin marketing its solutions.

Industries
Syncron serves multinational manufacturing and distribution companies that operate within different industry sectors.
 Aerospace and defense
 Agricultural equipment
 Automotive
 Energy and utilities
 Electronics
 Industrial equipment
 Medical
 Mining and construction equipment
 Third party logistics
 Wholesale and distribution

Customers
Syncron customers include: Alfa Laval, Atlas Copco, British Gas, Daimler Trucks North America, Electrolux, GE Aviation, Hitachi Construction Machinery, JCB, KCI Konecranes, Komatsu, Mazda, Metso, Volvo Construction Equipment.

References

Supply chain software companies
Business software companies
ERP software companies
Information technology companies of the United States
Software companies of Sweden
Swedish brands
Companies based in Stockholm